Heinz Wittmann (born September 12, 1943) is a German former footballer who spent 8 seasons in the Bundesliga with Borussia Mönchengladbach.

Honours
 UEFA Cup finalist: 1973.
 Bundesliga champion: 1970, 1971.
 DFB-Pokal winner: 1973.

External links
 

1943 births
Living people
German footballers
Borussia Mönchengladbach players
Bundesliga players
Association football defenders